Aayiram Pookkal Malarattum is a 1986 Indian Tamil-language  romance film written and directed by E. Ramdoss in his debut. The film stars Mohan, Seetha and Ranjini. It was released on 8 August 1986.

Plot

Cast 

Mohan
Seetha
Ranjini
Goundamani
Senthil
Janagaraj
Rajkumar Sethupathi
Chakravarthy
Meesai Murugesan
Madhumohan
Poornam Viswanathan
Charle
Thyagu
Chinni Jayanth
Rajan
Kuyili
Baby Anju
Baby Sharada Preetha
K. S. Ravikumar

Production 
E. Ramdoss who worked as an assistant to Manivannan made his directorial debut with this film.<ref>{{Cite web |date=11 November 2016 |title="கவிக்கோ காட்டிய வழி!{{}} |url=https://cinema.vikatan.com/tamil-cinema/125527-actor-ramdas-interview |url-status=live |archive-url=https://web.archive.org/web/20220714103725/https://cinema.vikatan.com/tamil-cinema/125527-actor-ramdas-interview |archive-date=14 July 2022 |access-date=14 July 2022 |website=Ananda Vikatan |language=ta}}</ref> Despite a publicised fallout between the producer and the original music composer Ilaiyaraaja, the film became a success commercially.

 Soundtrack 
Soundtrack was composed by V. S. Narasimhan.

 Reception Kalki'' said the music by Narasimhan was "okay", and lauded the cinematography by Dinesh Babu.

References

External links 
 

1980s romance films
1980s Tamil-language films
1986 directorial debut films
1986 films
Films directed by E. Ramdoss
Films scored by V. S. Narasimhan
Indian romance films